Gene Wiley (born November 12, 1937) is an American former National Basketball Association (NBA) player for the Los Angeles Lakers.  He attended Carver High School in Amarillo, Texas and Wichita State University.  He was drafted in 1962 with the eighth pick in the second round by the Los Angeles Lakers.

Playing career
Wiley played for the Denver-Chicago Truckers of the AAU National Industrial Basketball League in 1961–62.

Wiley played four seasons in the NBA , with the Lakers. He averaged 4.2 points per game and 7.2 rebounds per game. In 1967, Wiley returned to professional basketball to play in the ABA. In one ABA season, he played for the Oakland Oaks and the Dallas Chaparrals. His ABA statistics were 2.0 points per game and 2.2 rebounds per game.

References

1937 births
Living people
[[Help
Category:Amateur Athletic Union men's basketball players]]
American men's basketball players
Basketball players from Texas
Centers (basketball)
Dallas Chaparrals players
Los Angeles Lakers draft picks
Los Angeles Lakers players
Oakland Oaks players
Sportspeople from Amarillo, Texas
Wichita State Shockers men's basketball players